Pollepel Island  is a  uninhabited island in the Hudson River in New York. The principal feature on the island is Bannerman's Castle, an abandoned military surplus warehouse.

Description
Pollepel Island has been called many different names, including Pollopel Island, Pollopel's Island, Bannerman's Island, and Bannermans' Island. Pollepel is a Dutch word meaning "(pot) ladle" 

Early history
Pollepel Island was encountered 
by the Europeans during the first navigation of the Hudson River by early Dutch settlers in the Province of New York, at the "Northern Gate" of the Hudson Highlands. During the Revolutionary War, patriots attempted to prevent the British from passing upriver by emplacing 106 chevaux de frise (upright logs tipped with iron points) between the island and Plum Point across the river (see Hudson River Chains). Caissons from several chevaux de frise still rest at the river bottom. Still, these obstructions did not stop a British flotilla from burning Kingston in 1777. General George Washington later signed a plan to use the island as a military prison; however, there is no evidence that a prison was ever built there.

Bannerman's Castle

Origin
Francis Bannerman VI was born on March 24, 1851, in Northern Ireland, according to Civil Registration records for Ireland, and immigrated to the United States with his parents in 1854. His grandfather was from Dundee, Scotland where he worked as a 'linenman'. The family moved to Brooklyn in 1858 and began a military surplus business near the Brooklyn Navy Yard in 1865 purchasing surplus military equipment at the close of the American Civil War.

In 1867 the business occupied a ship chandlery on Atlantic Avenue engaged in the purchase of worn rope for papermaking.  The store on the 500-block of Broadway opened in 1897 to outfit volunteers for the Spanish–American War. The business bought weapons directly from the Spanish government before it evacuated Cuba; and then purchased over 90 percent of the Spanish guns, ammunition, and equipment captured by the United States military and auctioned off by the United States government. Bannerman's illustrated mail order catalog expanded to 300 pages; and became a reference for collectors of antique military equipment.

Bannerman purchased Pollepel island in November 1900, for use as a storage facility for his growing surplus business. Because his storeroom in New York City was not large enough to provide a safe location to store thirty million surplus munitions cartridges, in the spring of 1901 he began to build an arsenal on Pollepel. Bannerman designed the buildings himself and let the constructors interpret the designs on their own.

Most of the building was devoted to the stores of army surplus but Bannerman built another castle in a smaller scale on top of the island near the main structure as a residence, often using items from his surplus collection for decorative touches. The castle, clearly visible from the shore of the river, served as a giant advertisement for his business. On the side of the castle facing the western bank of the Hudson, Bannerman cast the legend "Bannerman's Island Arsenal" into the wall.

Circa 1900–1910 the US Navy re-gunned a number of older ships. Bannerman bought the old guns, presumably at scrap value. In 1917, following the American entry into World War I, Bannerman sold a number of these weapons to the US Army, which intended to mount them on new carriages as field guns for the Western Front. Thirty 6-inch (152 mm) 30-caliber ex-Navy guns were acquired by the Army, but sources do not indicate whether any of these were sent to France. The Army's 6-inch gun units in France primarily used former Army coast defense weapons; none of these units completed training and thus did not see action.

Construction ceased at Bannerman's death in 1918. In August 1920, 200 pounds of shells and powder exploded in an ancillary structure, destroying a portion of the complex. Bannerman's sales of military weapons to civilians declined during the early 20th century as a result of state and federal legislation.  After the sinking of the ferryboat Pollepel, which had served the island, in a storm in 1950, the Arsenal and island were essentially left vacant. The island and buildings were bought by New York State in 1967, which took possession after the old military merchandise had been removed, and the relics given to the Smithsonian. For a short time, tours of the island were given in 1968. However, on August 8, 1969, fire devastated the Arsenal, and the roofs and floors were destroyed. Following the fire, the island was placed off-limits to the public.

Current status
In the 21st century, the castle is the property of the New York State Office of Parks, Recreation and Historic Preservation and is mostly in ruins. While portions of the exterior walls still stand, all the internal floors and non-structural walls have since burned down. The island has been the victim of vandalism, trespass, neglect, and decay. Several old bulkheads and causeways that submerge at high tide present a serious navigational hazard. On-island guided hard hat tours were recently made available through the Bannerman's Castle Trust.  The castle is easily visible to riders of the Metro-North Railroad Hudson Line and the Amtrak Empire Service and Adirondack lines. One side of the castle, which carries the words "Bannermans' Island Arsenal", is also visible to southbound riders.

Sometime during the week before December 28, 2009, parts of the castle collapsed.  Officials estimate 30–40 percent of the structure's front wall and about half of the east wall fell.  The collapse was reported by a motorist and by officials on the Metro-North.

On April 19, 2015, the island was the destination of a kayak trip taken by Vincent Viafore and his fiancée. Viafore drowned, and his fiancée was charged with his murder. On July 24, 2017, she pled guilty to criminally negligent homicide and served a short time in prison. 

On June 28, 2015, the public art piece Constellation by Beacon-based artist Melissa McGill debuted on and around the castle ruins. The work consists of seventeen LEDs mounted on metal poles of varying heights, which when lighted for two hours each night are intended to create the appearance of a new constellation.

Currently (2021) the island is under the care of "The Bannerman Castle Trust, Inc." which is a non-profit organization of “Friends” of volunteers who work with the New York State Office of Parks, Recreation and Historical Preservation. The Trust is dedicated to pooling resources and funding to stabilize buildings on Pollepel Island and to raise awareness and educate the public and governmental organizations about the island's value and history. The Trust is making the island safe for volunteers and the public to enjoy as an educational, cultural, historic and recreational facility that promotes historic tourism in the Hudson Valley. Bannerman Castle Trust

In popular culture

In literature
Bannerman Castle by authors Barbara Gottlock and Thom Johnson was released through Arcadia Press in August 2006. The book contains almost 200 vintage photographs, and the text documents the island's growth and decline.  Proceeds from the book go to the Bannerman Castle Trust in its ongoing efforts to preserve and improve the island's structures. Wesley Gottlock and Barbara H. Gottlock authored a children's book called, "My Name is Eleanor." It is based on photographs, interviews and journals of Eleanor Seeland. Seeland, an Ulster County resident, lived with her family who were residents of Pollepel Island in the early part of 20th century. Seeland's father was contracted by the Bannermans for about twelve years.

The main characters in Adventures of a Cat-Whiskered Girl by Daniel Pinkwater (2010), set in the 1950s, visit Pollepel Island and hang out with a family of trolls who are squatting in the abandoned castle.

The novel, The Devils That Haunt You (eBook 2016 and paperback 2018), by Rick Hoffman, takes place in part on Pollepel Island and features a fictionalized account of its construction and history.

References

External links

 Bannerman Castle Trust
 Bannerman Castle History on itsnewjersey.com
 Francis Bannerman Sons, Inc. records at Hagley Museum and Library
 Bannerman family papers at Hagley Museum and Library

Castles in the United States
Fishkill, New York
Islands of Dutchess County, New York
Landmarks in New York (state)
Ruins in the United States
National Register of Historic Places in Dutchess County, New York
Islands of the Hudson River
River islands of New York (state)
Uninhabited islands of New York (state)